Sun Zhongtong (born October 1944) is a retired general of the People's Liberation Army (PLA) of the People's Republic of China. He served as vice director of the PLA General Political Department.

Biography 
Born in Wendeng, Shandong, Sun entered the work force in September 1964, and joined the Chinese Communist Party (CCP) in September 1965. He graduated from the CCP Central Party School, majoring in economics management.

He enlisted in the army in January 1965, and served in various posts in the Liaoning Military District. He was elevated to vice director of the propaganda department of the PLA General Political Department in October 1990. In May 1993, he became editor-in-chief of the PLA Daily and president of the newspaper agency in September 1994. He became the assistant director of the General Political Department and a member of the CCP committee there in July 2001. He was elevated to vice director of the General Political Department in July 2004. In December of the same year, he was also appointed Secretary of the Commission for Discipline Inspection of the Central Military Commission.

He attained the rank of major general in July 1993, lieutenant general in July 2002, and full general in June 2006.

He was an alternate member of the 16th Central Committee of the Chinese Communist Party and a full member of the 17th Central Committee.

References

1944 births
Living people
Central Party School of the Chinese Communist Party alumni
People's Liberation Army generals from Shandong
Politicians from Weihai
Chinese Communist Party politicians from Shandong
People's Republic of China politicians from Shandong
Alternate members of the 16th Central Committee of the Chinese Communist Party
Members of the 17th Central Committee of the Chinese Communist Party
Delegates to the 11th National People's Congress